Tombola is a British gambling company which operates the largest online bingo website in Europe. The business is split into two divisions, UK and International. UK operations are conducted from its headquarters in Sunderland, while its International business operates from its satellite office in Gibraltar. In January 2022, Tombola was acquired by gambling conglomerate Flutter Entertainment for £402m.

The company produces original bingo software and games, created by an in-house development team, and is one of the largest employers of game and web developers in the north east of England.

Products
The Tombola.co.uk and .com domains are not available to customers outside of the UK. Instead, players from Italy, Spain, Portugal, Denmark, Sweden and Netherlands must access the website through their own national domains. A bingo app is available for iOS, Android, and Amazon Fire.

History
Tombola was established in 1999 by Phil Cronin. He had previously worked for his family's business Edward Thompson printers, until 1995. Under the Edward Thompson company name, the Cronin family have provided printed paper bingo tickets to bingo halls since the 1960s.

Tombola  'soft launched' in December 2005 using the Sun Newspaper as a brand, but retaining control of the business. The main launch went ahead in January 2006 as SunBingo. The Sun newspaper provided marketing and branding while Tombola  provided the website site, the games, staff, and technical infrastructure. This continued until August 2008 when Tombola became independent from the Sun, continuing on as Tombola, with all the staff being retained at that time. SunBingo continued with the Sun using JackpotJoy software as all Tombola games had been produced in-house by Tombola technicians and continue to do so. The Sun hired their own chat moderating staff as all chat moderation staff working until that time remained with Tombola .

In November 2011, Cronin was awarded Durham & Wearside Business Executive of the Year.

Since 2019, Tombola House is on Low Street, on the River Wear, half a mile from  the center of Sunderland.

In January 2022, Flutter Entertainment completed the acquisition of Tombola  and Cronin stepped down as CEO and sole owner.

Gaming licences
In November 2011, Tombola was licensed in Italy.
In June 2012, Tombola was licensed in Spain.
In March 2014, Tombola was licensed in the UK.
In February 2018, Tombola was licensed in Portugal.
In January 2019, Tombola was licensed in Denmark.
In March 2019, Tombola was licensed in Sweden.
In October 2021, Tombola was licensed in Netherlands.

Awards
Tombola has won twenty-seven awards since re-launching in 2008:

 2009: Most Online Bingo Prizes Won, Best Chat Host Team award
 2010: EGR Awards Online Bingo Operator of the Year, Online Bingo Awards Online Bingo Operator of the Year, Most Popular Online Bingo Site, Most Online Bingo Prizes Won, Best Online Game Innovation.
 2011: Most Popular Online Bingo Site, Best Chat Host Team
 2012: Best Bingo Chat Hosts of 2012, Bingo Operator of the Year 2012, Best Overall Online Bingo Operator, Best Online Bingo TV Commercial
 2013: Bingo Operator of the Year 2013, Socially Responsible Operator
 2014: Bingo Operator of the Year
 2015: Customer Services Operator, Socially Responsible Operator
 2016: Bingo Operator of the Year
 2017: Socially Responsible Operator, Bingo Operator of the Year
 2018: Bingo Operator of the Year, Marketing Campaign
 2019: Socially Responsible Operator, Bingo Operator of the Year, In-House Product
 2021: Safer Gambling Operator

Sponsorship
In November 2009, Tombola began sponsoring, for three years, ITV soap opera Emmerdale in a deal that ran until March 2012.

In April 2010, Tombola began sponsoring Sunderland AFC for the 2010/11 and 2011/12 English Premier League seasons.

In September 2014, Tombola began sponsoring the ITV daytime television show, Loose Women.

Since November 2017, Tombola sponsors I'm a Celebrity...Get Me Out of Here!.

Charity and community work

In 2012, Tombola became the main sponsors of Sunderland AFC Keroche, an African football club supported by Sunderland AFC fans in England. tombola paid for fifteen boxes of football kits to be shipped to Africa for the team.

In July 2014, Tombola launched the Tombola Academy.

References

External links
 

Gambling companies established in 1999
Companies based in the City of Sunderland
1999 establishments in England
Online gambling companies of the United Kingdom
Bingo
2022 mergers and acquisitions